The 1979 Murray State Racers football team represented Murray State University during the 1979 NCAA Division I-AA football season. Led by second-year head coach Mike Gottfried, the Racers compiled an overall record of 9–2–1 with a mark of 6–0 on conference play, winning the OVC title. Murray State advanced to the NCAA Division I-AA Football Championship playoffs, where they lost to Lehigh in the semifinals.

Schedule

References

Murray State
Murray State Racers football seasons
Ohio Valley Conference football champion seasons
Murray State Racers football